Philip Matthew Seibel (born January 28, 1979) is a former Major League Baseball left-handed pitcher.

Biography
Seibel attended the University of Texas, where he pitched for the Texas Longhorns baseball team from 1998 to 2000.  He also pitched for Team USA in 1999.

His professional career began in 2000 when he was drafted in the 8th round by the Montreal Expos. In April 2002 he was traded along with two other players to the New York Mets for Bruce Chen, Dicky Gonzalez, Luis Figueroa, and a player to be named later (Saul Rivera). Following the 2003 season, Seibel was placed on waivers by the Mets and picked up by the Boston Red Sox.

Seibel made his major league debut on April 15, 2004, and faced just two batters. The first batter reached on an error, and the second batter walked. He also pitched on April 18, 2004, against the New York Yankees, where he pitched 3 scoreless, hitless innings, and received a no-decision in the Red Sox loss. He walked 5 and struck out one.  Seibel received a World Series ring for his work in April.

Seibel sat out the entire 2005 season recovering from Tommy John surgery, then rejoined the Red Sox for their 2006 spring training in Florida as a non-roster invitee, he was shipped back to the minors on March 17.  He spent the 2006 season in the minors with Greenville, Portland and Pawtucket, going 6-3 with a 1.24 ERA for the 3 teams. Seibel was traded to the Los Angeles Angels of Anaheim for pitcher Brendan Donnelly on December 15, 2006.

As of September 25, 2008, he was an assistant in the scouting department for the Arizona Diamondbacks. In 2009, Phil and his wife Charity were married in a ceremony in Playa Del Carmen, Mexico.

References

External links

1979 births
Living people
Boston Red Sox players
Arizona Diamondbacks scouts
Baseball players from Louisville, Kentucky
Major League Baseball pitchers
Texas Longhorns baseball players
Jupiter Hammerheads players
Binghamton Mets players
Norfolk Tides players
Gulf Coast Red Sox players
Portland Sea Dogs players
Pawtucket Red Sox players
Greenville Drive players
Salt Lake Bees players
Anchorage Glacier Pilots players